The Kid's Last Ride is a 1941 American Western film directed by S. Roy Luby and written by Earle Snell. The film is the fifth in Monogram Pictures' "Range Busters" series, and it stars Ray "Crash" Corrigan as Crash, John "Dusty" King as Dusty and Max "Alibi" Terhune as Alibi, with Luana Walters, Edwin Brian and Alan Bridge. The film was released on February 10, 1941, by Monogram Pictures.

Plot

Cast
Ray "Crash" Corrigan as Crash Corrigan 
John 'Dusty' King as Dusty King
Max Terhune as Alibi Terhune 
Luana Walters as Sally Rowell
Edwin Brian as Jimmy Rowell
Alan Bridge as Bob Harmon / Jim Breeden
Glenn Strange as Bart Gill / Ike Breeden 
Frank Ellis as Wash
John Elliott as Dish washer
George Havens as Johnny

See also
The Range Busters series:

 The Range Busters (1940)
 Trailing Double Trouble (1940)
 West of Pinto Basin (1940)
 Trail of the Silver Spurs (1941)
 The Kid's Last Ride (1941)
 Tumbledown Ranch in Arizona (1941)
 Wrangler's Roost (1941)
 Fugitive Valley (1941)
 Saddle Mountain Roundup (1941)
 Tonto Basin Outlaws (1941)
 Underground Rustlers (1941)
 Thunder River Feud (1942)
 Rock River Renegades (1942)
 Boot Hill Bandits (1942)
 Texas Trouble Shooters (1942)
 Arizona Stage Coach (1942)
 Texas to Bataan (1942)
 Trail Riders (1942)
 Two Fisted Justice (1943)
 Haunted Ranch (1943)
 Land of Hunted Men (1943)
 Cowboy Commandos (1943)
 Black Market Rustlers (1943)
 Bullets and Saddles (1943)

References

External links
 

1941 films
1940s English-language films
American Western (genre) films
1941 Western (genre) films
Monogram Pictures films
Films directed by S. Roy Luby
American black-and-white films
Range Busters
1940s American films